Deputy superintendent of police (DSP) is a rank used by several police forces in the Commonwealth and formerly in the British Empire. The rank is usually above assistant superintendent and below superintendent.

India

The rank of deputy superintendent of police or Assistant commissioner of police (ACP), in the commissionerate system, was created in 1876 as the policy of Indianisation was introduced. It was originally a rank only held by Indians and was equivalent to assistant superintendent (a rank then only held by Europeans). Deputy superintendents (DSP or DySP) are now state police officers who belong to the provincial police forces, either direct entrants at that rank or promoted from inspector. Assistant commissioners of police, who are members of the provincial forces, can be promoted to the Indian Police Service after limited years of service which varies from 8 to 15 years depending on the state. Deputy superintendents are generally posted as circle officers in a district. In the states of Rajasthan and Uttar Pradesh, the rank is commonly known as circle officer (CO), although this is not technically correct as CO is a post, not a rank. In the state of West Bengal, a DSP is in charge of a sub-division and is most commonly known as a sub divisional police officer (SDPO).

Candidates must be Indian citizens with any degree and between the ages of 21 to 38 years. In Tamil Nadu,  is the minimum height required. Every year, the state governments prepare a list of members of the state police service to be suitable for promotion to the Indian police Service. Officers recruited by state Public Service Commissions receive this rank directly. The rank above it is Superintendent of Police and the rank below is Inspector.

Singapore
The rank of deputy superintendent of police is the highest rank attainable by an officer in the National Police Cadet Corps. The rank of acting deputy superintendent of police is vested onto NPCC headquarters appointment holders who have not actually attained the rank of deputy superintendent of police. The rank insignia of deputy superintendent of police and acting deputy superintendent of police is the same, with both wearing the Singapore coat of arms above a single pip.

NPCC officers who hold the rank of deputy superintendent of police have a single row of silver braid on the peak of their cap (for males) or bowler hat (for females).

References

Police ranks of India